Hala Husni Fariz Odeh, also known as Hala Fariz, (Born on 25 October 1955 – ) is a Palestinian diplomat. 

She presented her credentials to the Minister of Foreign Affairs On September 2011 as the Ambassador of the Palestinian National Authority.

In 2014, Sweden recognized the State of Palestine. On 30 January 2015, Fariz presented her credentials as Ambassador of the State of Palestine to the King of Sweden.

Her assignments in Sweden ended in 2021.

See also 

 Embassy of the State of Palestine in Sweden

References 

Ambassadors of the State of Palestine to Sweden
Living people
1955 births
Palestinian women ambassadors
Palestinian women diplomats